Roger Rossmeisl  (1927 in Kiel – 1979 in Berlin) was a German luthier who designed electric guitars in the 1950s and '60s for the US companies Rickenbacker and Fender.

Life and work
Roger's father Wenzel Rossmeisl (June 28, 1902 in Kiel – April 3, 1975 in Munich) was a German jazz guitarist and had learned luthiery in Mittenwald. Father and son made the first electric guitar in Germany in 1947 (a lap steel guitar).

Based in Berlin the Rossmeisl's were pioneers in Germany in the design and manufacture of electric pickups. In 1946–7 Roger rebuilt pickups for the jazz guitarist Coco Schumann. Meanwhile, electrical components such as coils and magnets came from headphones and other equipment of the German armed forces (Wehrmacht)  In the late 1930s Wenzel sent his son for traditional luthiery training in Mittenwald, a center of violin and guitar making. Wenzel Rossmeisl sold his products under the brand name Roger in the late 1930s, as one of very few guitar manufacturers in Germany, until 1962. He also distributed guitars by the Italian manufacturer Eko.

In September 1953 Roger Rossmeisl completed his business in Berlin and emigrated to the US. After a short time at the guitar manufacturer Gibson in Kalamazoo, Michigan, he worked for the California manufacturers Rickenbacker. At Rickenbacker he was instrumental in the development of new product ranges including the Rickenbacker 300 series of guitars, and the Rickenbacker 4000 and 4001 basses. Semie Mosely, later the founder of Mosrite, was an apprentice at Rickenbacker under Rossmeisl.

In 1962 he moved to Fender, where he was responsible for the development of archtop and semi-acoustic guitars in the style of the Gibson ES-335, such as the Fender Coronado. Characteristic of his designs for Rickenbacker and Fender is the distinctive form of the guitar top: While traditional archtops have a uniform curvature similar to violins and cellos, Rossmeisl's designs have a strong bead on the slab edge and an almost flat surface in the center of the ceiling. This design feature is in English referred to as the "German Carve". While at Fender Rossmeisl hired the young Philip Kubicki, who went on to found his own company. After the Rossmeisl-designed Fender guitars were commercial failures, he returned in 1973 to Germany. He gave up guitar design and died in 1979 at the age of 52.

Instruments designed by Roger Rossmeisl

Rickenbacker

 Rickenbacker Combo 800
 Rickenbacker Combo 600
 Rickenbacker 4000 Bass
 Rickenbacker 4001 Bass

Rickenbacker 300 Series

 Rickenbacker 325
 Rickenbacker 330
 Rickenbacker 330/12
 Rickenbacker 340
 Rickenbacker 340/12
 Rickenbacker 360
 Rickenbacker 360/12
 Rickenbacker 370
 Rickenbacker 370/12
 Rickenbacker 380L Laguna (discontinued)

Fender

 Fender Coronado
 Fender Montego
 Fender Wildwood
 Fender LTD
 Fender Telecaster Thinline

Literature 
 Rainer Kordus:  Roger guitars – success story of a German luthier family,  in  electric guitars;  special issue of the journal Guitar

Resources
 Erfolgsgeschichte einer deutschen Gitarrenbauerfamilie, in: Stromgitarren; Sonderheft der Zeitschrift Gitarre & Bass zur Geschichte der E-Gitarre, S. 112–115. MM-Musik-Media-Verlag, Ulm 2004. 
 Carlo May: Vintage-Gitarren und ihre Geschichten. Darin: Kapitel Alles Roger? – Die Rossmeisls und ihre Gitarren,'' S. 68–71. MM-Musik-Media-Verlag, Ulm 1994.

External links
Rossmeisl und Roger-Gitarren auf schlaggitarren.de (German)
Peter R. McCormack: The Rossmeisl Guitar Legacy – Roger to Rickenbacker at rickresource.com 
Philip Kubicki: Rossmeisl Guitars – Father and Son Operation at vintageguitar.com 
Fotogalerie mit einer typischen Roger-Schlaggitarre auf vintageaudioberlin.de (German)

References 

Guitar makers
Fender people
1927 births
1979 deaths
German designers